The Junior men's race at the 1988 IAAF World Cross Country Championships was held in Auckland, New Zealand, at the Ellerslie Racecourse on March 26, 1988.   A report on the event was given in the Glasgow Herald.

Complete results, medallists, 
 and the results of British athletes were published.

Race results

Junior men's race (8.031 km)

Individual

†:Cosmas Ndeti of  finished 2nd in 23:31 min, but was disqualified.

Teams

Note: Athletes in parentheses did not score for the team result

Participation
An unofficial count yields the participation of 96 athletes from 25 countries in the Junior men's race, one athlete less than the official number published.

 (5)
 (5)
 (6)
 (2)
 (5)
 (4)
 (1)
 (3)
 (5)
 (1)
 (5)
 (6)
 (6)
 (1)
 (5)
 (6)
 (3)
 (2)
 (6)
 (1)
 (6)
 (6)
 (3)
 (2)
 (1)

See also
 1988 IAAF World Cross Country Championships – Senior men's race
 1988 IAAF World Cross Country Championships – Senior women's race

References

Junior men's race at the World Athletics Cross Country Championships
IAAF World Cross Country Championships
1988 in youth sport